Akwatia is one of the constituencies represented in the Parliament of Ghana. It elects one Member of Parliament (MP) by the first past the post system of election. Akwatia is located in the Denkyembour district  of the Eastern Region of Ghana.

Boundaries
The constituency is located within the Denkyembour District of the Eastern Region of Ghana.

Members of Parliament

Elections

The 2008 parliamentary election was rerun in 6 polling stations on 18 August 2009. It was won by the NPP candidate.

See also
List of Ghana Parliament constituencies

References

Adam Carr's Election Archives
Ghana Home Page

Parliamentary constituencies in the Eastern Region (Ghana)